James Hunt Corson (January 14, 1906 – November 12, 1981) was an American athlete who competed mainly in the discus throw.  He competed for the United States in the 1928 Summer Olympics held in Amsterdam in the discus throw where he won the bronze medal.

Corson served as interim president of Willamette University in 1972–73.

James Corson, born in 1906, earned his bachelor's degree from the University of Pacific, where he was also a tackle on their football team. He went on to receive his master's degree from the University of Southern California and was the recipient of an honorary doctorate from his alma mater. In addition to playing football, Corson won the bronze medal in the discus throw for the United States in the 1928 Summer Olympics held in Amsterdam, Netherlands. By the time he joined Willamette, Corson had been a teacher, coach, and dean, but above all he considered himself an administrator who got the job done. When Willamette University Board Chairman George Atkinson approached Corson with the offer to serve as interim president, Corson was 66 years of age and happy to take the position with no desire to be promoted. He took over an administration plagued with low morale and broken trust after Fritz's term and left Willamette having "revivified the spirit of Willamette by approaching problems openly, practically and sensibly…" Corson came to Willamette to help in any way he could or as he would have said it "to put a little hay in the barn."

References

1906 births
1981 deaths
American male discus throwers
American football tackles
Athletes (track and field) at the 1928 Summer Olympics
Pacific Tigers athletic directors
Pacific Tigers football players
Presidents of Willamette University
Olympic bronze medalists for the United States in track and field
University of Southern California alumni
Medalists at the 1928 Summer Olympics
20th-century American academics